Endless-piston principle is a dispensing variation of rotating positive displacement pumps. Their operating principle can be compared with an endless piston that conveys the product from the suction side to the discharge side, building up a differential pressure in the process.

At the core of every application is a volumetric conveying pump. The interaction between an eccentrically moving rotor and a stator adapted to application conditions produces flow and dosing characteristics resembling those of an endlessly moving piston, as mentioned above.

This geometry ensures that, per rotation, a constant flow volume proportional to rotary angle is always produced. The flow direction is reversed by changing the direction of rotation. Volume is therefore clearly determined by degree angle. A further advantage of this technology is that a pressure-stable, linear pump characteristic curve is obtained. From these facts we can conclude that there is a definable ratio between rotation, time and flow volume. Therefore, these pumps can produce a constant dosing volume via the parameters of time or rotation, when used in an application. This results in a guaranteed dosing accuracy of 1% at the pump outlet (depending on the medium). This figure is often even better in practice.

An additional advantage is the discharge chamber that is created – its volume remains absolutely constant during the course of displacement. This leads to the possibility of conveying and filling media containing solids and even pieces.

Compared to other conveying methods, this pumping technology has even more advantages to offer: For example, in over 95% of all applications it is possible to eliminate filling and dosing valves completely, since the pump goes into reverse flow at the end of dosing, which breaks off the product thread or prevents any dripping. It is possible to dispense low to high viscous products very precise, stabile and free of pulsation.

References

Pumps